Listen Lester is a 1924 black-and-white silent film drama/comedy film directed by William A. Seiter, with a screen adaptation by Lewis Milestone and William A. Seiter, based upon the 1918 stage play of the same name.  Released by Universal Pictures on May 20, 1924, the film stars Louise Fazenda and Harry Myers.

Prints of the film exist in the Library of Congress film archive.

Plot
Widower Colonel Dodge (Alec B. Francis) enjoys being single, but when Arbutus Quilty (Louise Fazenda), his former sweetheart, threatens to sue him for breach of promise, he decides its time for him and his daughter Mary (Eva Novak) to take themselves a little vacation trip to Florida.  Angry, Arbutus enlists the aid of lady detective Miss Pink (Dot Farley) and follows the two to Florida.  At his hotel, the Colonel enlists the aid of the hotel detective Listen Lester (Harry Myers) to get back the incriminating love letters he had written to Arbutus.  The detective accomplishes his task but is himself foiled when Miss Pink recovers the letters.  A hotel clerk then gets them back, but in turn loses them back to Arbutus.  Mary in the meantime is sparking up a romance with Jack Griffin (George O'Hara), but Jack believes that the Colonel is her beau instead of her father and declines involvement.  In desperation, Arbustus enlists the aid of Lester to fake she and Mary getting kidnapped in the hope that this will bring the men to their senses.  One of the fake kidnappers takes himself too seriously and gets a bit rough with Mary.  Jack rescues the women and he and Mary reconcile.  Out of ideas, Arbustus decides to stop chasing the Colonel.  When the Colonel realizes how much he would miss her attentions, he discovers that he does love her after all.  Both couples get married.

Cast
 Louise Fazenda as Arbutus Quilty 
 Harry Myers as Listen Lester 
 Eva Novak as Mary Dodge 
 George O'Hara as Jack Griffin 
 Lee Moran as William Penn 
 Alec B. Francis as Colonel Dodge 
 Dot Farley as Miss Pink

References

External links
 Listen Lester at the Internet Movie Database

1924 films
1924 comedy-drama films
American silent feature films
American black-and-white films
1920s English-language films
Films directed by William A. Seiter
American independent films
1920s independent films
1920s American films
Silent American comedy-drama films